A royal consort is the spouse of a ruling monarch. Consorts of monarchs in the Grand Duchy of Oldenburg and its predecessor states had no constitutional status or power, but many had significant influence over their spouse.

Overview
From the elevation of the County of Oldenburg to a Duchy and later a Grand Duchy, the monarchy of Oldenburg had four royal consorts: one duchess and three grand duchesses. Although their husbands were the rulers of the Oldenburg territory, they were not the heads of the House of Oldenburg; that honor lies with the Oldenburg Kings of Denmark and later the Glücksburg Dukes of Schleswig-Holstein, descended from Count Christian VI. The Queen consorts of Denmark held the title of Countess (later Duchess) of Oldenburg, but it wasn't until 1667 to 1773 that Denmark controlled Oldenburg. Then it was passed to the Russians, who were ruled by another scion of the House of Oldenburg.

All female consorts have had the right to and have held the title of countess, duchess, or grand duchess consort, depending on the years. As all rulers of Oldenburg had to be male due to the Salic law of male succession and total exclusion of female succession, there was never a male consort of Oldeburg. Consorts held the titles, Countess consort of Oldenburg (1088-1774), Duchess of consort Oldenburg (1774-1815/1829), and last of all, Grand Duchess consort of Oldenburg (1815/1829-1918). Had their existed a consort from 1815 to 1829, they would have been in the awkward situation of being a Duchess consort reigning in a Grand duchy. Oldenburg had been elevated to a Grand Duchy in 1815 after the Napoleonic War, but William and Peter I never used the title of Grand Duke of Oldenburg. But William and Peter I had no wives living during that period.
 
Not all wives of monarchs have become consorts, as they may have died, been divorced, had their marriage declared invalid prior to their husbands' ascending the throne, or married after abdication. Such cases include:

 Adelheid of Oldenburg-Delmenhorst, the only daughter of Otto IV, Count of Delmenhorst; first wife of Dietrich (as Hereditary Prince of the County of Oldenburg), married circa 1401, said to have died already in 1404.
 Sibylle Elisabeth of Brunswick-Dannenberg, the only daughter of Henry III, Duke of Brunswick-Lüneburg; wife of Anthony II (after the partition of Oldenburg, in 1577, with husband receiving Delmenhorst), married circa 1600, died 9 July 1630.
 Friederike of Württemberg, the second daughter of Frederick II Eugene, Duke of Württemberg; wife of Peter I (as heir to the duchy of Oldenburg), married 6 June 1781, died 24 November 1785.
 Adelheid of Anhalt-Bernburg-Schaumburg-Hoym, the second daughter of Victor II, Prince of Anhalt-Bernburg-Schaumburg-Hoym; wife of Augustus I (as Hereditary Grand Duke), married 24 July 1817, died 13 September 1820.
 Ida of Anhalt-Bernburg-Schaumburg-Hoym, the fourth daughter of Victor II, Prince of Anhalt-Bernburg-Schaumburg-Hoym; wife of Augustus I (as Hereditary Grand Duke), married 24 June 1825, died 31 March 1828.
 Elisabeth Anna of Prussia, the second daughter of Prince Frederick Charles of Prussia; wife of Frederick Augustus II (as Hereditary Grand Duke), married 18 February 1878, died 28 August 1895.

From 1774 to the end of the monarchy in 1918, only William, Duke of Oldenburg and Peter I, Duke of Oldenburg have reigned without spouses.

After the Grand Duchy was abolished in 1918, the spouse of the head of the old Grand Ducal family of Oldenburg is the titular Grand Duchess consort of Oldenburg.  The current titular grand duchess is Princess Ameli of Löwenstein-Wertheim-Freudenberg, the wife of Anton-Günther, Duke of Oldenburg, the head of the grand ducal family of Oldenburg.

If Duke Christian of Oldenburg, Anton-Günther's son and heir, ascends to the role of Head of the Grand Ducal Family of Oldenburg, his wife, Countess Caroline zu Rantzau, will become the titular Grand Duchess of Oldenburg.

Countess of Oldenburg (1088–1774)

Duchess of Oldenburg (1774–1829)

Grand Duchess of Oldenburg (1829–1918)

Titular Grand Duchess of Oldenburg (since 1918)

See also
 Counts, dukes and grand dukes of Oldenburg
 List of Danish royal consorts
 List of consorts of Schleswig and Holstein
 List of consorts of Holstein-Sonderburg
 List of Russian royal consorts

References

External links

House of Oldenburg, family tree of the Counts of Oldenburg and Wildeshausen 

 
 
People from Oldenburg (city)
Oldenburg, Consort of
Oldenburg, Consort of
Oldenburg, List of royal consorts of